Peter Russell Denyer (born 26 November 1957) is an English former professional footballer who played as a midfielder.

References

Living people
1957 births
English footballers
Association football midfielders
English Football League players
Portsmouth F.C. players
Northampton Town F.C. players